The 1960–61 Primeira Divisão was the 27th season of top-tier football in Portugal.

Overview
The competition was contested by 14 teams with S.L. Benfica winning the 1960–61 Primeira Divisão championship. It was the eleventh championship title for the club. Benfica also won the 1961–62 European Cup and qualified for the 1961–62 competition. This enabled second placed Sporting CP to also qualify for the European Cup. Leixões S.C. qualified for the Cup Winners' Cup and C.F. Os Belenenses for the Inter-Cities Fairs Cup. The two lowest placed teams of the competition, S.C. Braga and F.C. Barreirense were relegated to the Segunda Divisão.

Details of participants

Details of the 14 participants are provided below:

League standings

Results

Top scorer
José Águas (S.L. Benfica) was the top scorer of the season with 27 goals.

Promotion and relegation 1961–62
Relegation to Segunda Divisão
 Braga
 Barreirense

Promotion to Primeira Divisão
 Olhanense
 Beira Mar

References

External links
 Portugal 1960-61 - RSSSF (Jorge Miguel Teixeira)
 Portuguese League 1960/61 - footballzz.co.uk
 Portugal - Table of Honor - Soccer Library

Primeira Liga seasons
1960–61 in Portuguese football
Portugal